Sidi Belyout is an arrondissement of Casablanca, in the Anfa district of the Casablanca-Settat region of Morocco. As of 2004 it had 218,918 inhabitants.

References

Arrondissements of Casablanca